Rajiv Gandhi Proudyogiki Vishwavidyalaya (RGPV), also known as  State Technological University of Madhya Pradesh, is a state university situated in Bhopal, Madhya Pradesh, India. It is a multi-campus affiliating, research university offering diploma, undergraduate, postgraduate, integrated, dual and doctoral courses in fields like engineering, technology, pharmacy, management, architecture, design and applied sciences. The university has been accredited with Grade ‘A’ by NAAC.

History
RGPV was established in the year 1998, by Madhya Pradesh Vidhan Sabha Act 13, 1998. The university was established by the Government of Madhya Pradesh as a common university for all the technical institutes, mainly including engineering and pharmacy colleges in the state of Madhya Pradesh. The university was named after the former Prime Minister of India, Rajiv Gandhi.

Administration
The Governor of Madhya Pradesh is the ex officio Chancellor of the university. The university is headed by the Vice-Chancellor, assisted by the registrar, two controllers, for exams and finance, and two deputy registrars for administration and academics. There are five deans, who have authority over the academic departments of civil engineering, computer & information technology, electrical & electronics, industrial technology, and applied sciences. The polytechnic wing is administered by a secretary and a research officer.

Academics

All course work and examinations for all majors and subjects are conducted with English language as the mode of instruction. Undergraduate courses are given in various fields like engineering, technology, pharmacy, management, architecture, design and applied sciences. Postgraduate courses include Master of Technology (M.Tech.), Master of Science (M.Sc.), Master of Design (M.Des), Master of Architecture (M.Arch), Master of Pharmacy (M.Pharm.), Master of Computer Applications (MCA) in relevant fields, as well as other master's degrees. Dual postgraduate courses with Management (B.E.+ MBA) or Technology (B.E. + M.Tech.). Master of Science (M.S.) degree in Cyber Law and Information Security is a collaborative programme, jointly offered by the National Law Institute University, Bhopal and RGPV. Integrated degree course Master of Applied Management (MAM). Doctor of Philosophy (PhD) is also offered in all the above departments. Degrees are conferred and meritorious students are awarded with gold medals presented by the Hon'ble President of India during annual convocation ceremony.

Admissions
RGPV offers three-year diploma programmes for 10th and 12th (High School & Higher Secondary School respectively) pass candidates, admission requires taking the state level pre-polytechnic test exam (MP PPT). Admission to the various four-year Bachelor of Engineering (B.E.) programmes and to Bachelor of Pharmacy (B.Pharm.) is through JEE Main and 12th standard marks merit. Admission to the 5-year dual degree programmes (which award B.E. with either M.Tech or MBA) is through JEE Main as well, but requires separate counseling. Admission to other M.Tech. degrees is through Graduate Aptitude Test in Engineering (GATE). Admission to M.Pharm is through Graduate Pharmacy Aptitude Test (GPAT). Common Entrance Examination for Design for M.Des and National Aptitude Test in Architecture (NATA) for architecture courses. MP Pre-Master of Computer Applications Test (MP Pre MCA) for MCA course. GATE / GPAT / NET, followed by interviews for PhD courses.

Affiliated institutes

Rajiv Gandhi Proudyogiki Vishwavidyalaya affiliated institutes include 5 teaching institutions, 200 engineering institutions, 98 pharmacy institutions, 95 MCA institutions, 4 architecture institutions and 85 diploma institutions.
Colleges like Government Engineering College, Jabalpur are now autonomous and no longer affiliated to RGPV.

Campus

The institution is in Gandhi Nagar, on the outskirts of the city, 3 km from the Raja Bhoj Airport on the Gwalior bypass road. The main buildings start 1 km from the main gate. The campus has an administrative block, instruction blocks, workshops, library block, research centres, hostels for students, sports and recreational facilities, residential blocks for the faculty and staff.

References

External links
 RGPV website
 RGPV Info portal

Engineering colleges in Madhya Pradesh
Universities in Bhopal
Memorials to Rajiv Gandhi
Educational institutions established in 1998
1998 establishments in Madhya Pradesh
Government universities and colleges in India